The Italian bleak or white bleak (Alburnus albidus) is a species of freshwater fish in the family Cyprinidae, endemic to Italy. The species and three of its synonyms were described by O. G. Costa in 1838.

References

Alburnus
Freshwater fish of Europe
Fish described in 1838
Taxa named by Oronzio Gabriele Costa
Endemic fauna of Italy
Taxonomy articles created by Polbot